Fenya or fen'ka is a Russian cant language used among criminals. In modern Russian language it is also referred to as blatnoy language, where "blatnoy" is a slang expression for "professional criminal". It is also widely used in "thieves' songs".

Etymology 
Initially, this was the name of the Ofen language (formerly "Suzdal dialect"). This is a language that was formed in Russia, in the Middle Ages, and was originally used by the ofenyas (traveling merchants). 

The god-haulers — "ofenyas engaged in the resale of icons" created a cryptolanguage, inventing new roots and leaving the traditional Russian morphology, and used this invented language to communicate "not for other people's ears".

Overview
The grammar of fenya is Russian; the vocabulary has changed over time.

The original fenya consisted of broken Russian words borrowed from Greek and other foreign languages. Vladimir Dahl in his Explanatory Dictionary of the Live Great Russian language gives the following examples:
"Ропа кимать, полумеркот, рыхло закурещат ворыханы."
Normative Russian: "Пора спать, полночь; скоро запоют петухи."
Translation: "It's time to go to bed, it's midnight, soon the roosters will be crowing."
"Да позагорбил басве слемзить: астона басвинска ухалила дряботницей."
Normative Russian: "Да позабыл тебе сказать: жена твоя померла весною."
Translation: "Oh, I forgot to tell you: your wife died this spring."

Also, fenya included usual Russian words in unusual meanings, like шаблон shablon (template) for military or police headwear, педаль pedal''' (pedal) for mobile phone (recent addition).

The vocabulary changed over time, with notable infusion of words of Yiddish origin. During the times of the Soviet Union fenya penetrated into common spoken Russian and can no longer be considered cryptic, although it is still commonly associated with those who have connections to the Russian criminal culture or who have spent a significant amount of time incarcerated.

A number  of explanations for this phenomenon are suggested. For one, a significant part of the population, not necessarily criminals, went through labor camps, and massive indiscriminate amnesties after the death of Joseph Stalin resulted in a penetration of the subculture of convicts into everyday life in the form of a shock wave. Particularly, many writers, poets, and journalists who had been arrested began to use fenya in their work after release. Another reason comes from the fact that criminal life was romanticized in popular culture: for example, in the form of "blatnaya song". Few "common" Russians possess a complete or even complex understanding of fenya and fewer still - for various reasons - will admit to it.Fenya influences Russian culture in different ways. In particular, a whole subgenre of Russian humour exists, in which a known tale, such as Romeo and Juliet or a popular Russian fairy tale is cast into fenya.

The dissolution of the Soviet Union and the appearance of "New Russians" introduced new changes into fenya'', notably assigning new meanings and accents to common words.

In January 2016, the use of profanity and fenya by prisoners in pretrial detention centers was banned in the Russian prison system. This follows a 2013 ban on the use of fenya by prison guards.

See also
 The article Cant lists similar languages in other cultures
 Mat (Russian profanity)
 Thief in law

References

External links
 Glossary of Russian criminal slang (Russian)
 Russian criminal slang dictionaries (1859-1927) (Russian)

Russian slang
Cant languages
Crime in Russia